Rachid Djebaili (born 26 April 1975) is a former professional footballer who played as a forward in five countries. Born in Besançon, France, Djebaili represented the Algeria national football team three times. One of those appearances was in a match against his native country which had to be abandoned after 74 minutes due to a pitch invasion.

Djebaili joined Scottish Premier League side St Johnstone in 2001 and made 14 appearances, 13 in the league, before leaving the following year.

References

External links
 
 

1975 births
Living people
Sportspeople from Besançon
French sportspeople of Algerian descent
Footballers from Bourgogne-Franche-Comté
French footballers
Algerian footballers
Association football forwards
Algeria international footballers
Scottish Premier League players
Süper Lig players
Regionalliga players
Racing Besançon players
SR Delémont players
Olympique Noisy-le-Sec players
St Johnstone F.C. players
Göztepe S.K. footballers
Riffa SC players
SC Paderborn 07 players
FC Lausanne-Sport players
French expatriate footballers
Algerian expatriate footballers
Algerian expatriate sportspeople in Switzerland
Expatriate footballers in Switzerland
Algerian expatriate sportspeople in Scotland
Expatriate footballers in Scotland
Algerian expatriate sportspeople in Turkey
Expatriate footballers in Turkey
Algerian expatriate sportspeople in Bahrain
Expatriate footballers in Bahrain
Algerian expatriate sportspeople in Germany
French expatriate sportspeople in Switzerland
French expatriate sportspeople in Scotland
French expatriate sportspeople in Turkey
French expatriate sportspeople in Bahrain
French expatriate sportspeople in Germany